The Packard Station Sedan was a pseudo luxury station wagon model produced by the Packard Motor Car Company of Detroit, Michigan between 1948 and 1950, using the Packard Eight platform.  By offering the Station Sedan Packard could market a vehicle with station wagon attributes, but without the investment cost associated with a complete station wagon development program.

The Station Sedan used a combination of steel framing and body parts along with structural wood panels made from northern birch to create a "woody" station wagon-like car due to the growing popularity of them after World War II.  Unlike other woody wagons of the day, which used wooden passenger compartments mounted to chassis of a particular car, the Station Sedan used a steel subframe and steel passenger doors onto which hard wood panels were mounted. The only wooden door on the vehicle was the rear gate assembly. Unlike competitor station wagons from Buick, Chrysler and Mercury, the Packard's length was not long enough to accommodate optional third row seating.

Neither a sedan, nor true station wagon, the Station Sedan enjoyed limited success, with a listed retail price of US$3,459 ($ in  dollars ) for its final year of 1950, and was discontinued when the 1951 Packard models were introduced.

References

Station Sedan
Rear-wheel-drive vehicles
Station wagons